The Issy-les-Moulineaux Congress was the second national congress of the French Socialist Party (Parti socialiste or PS). It took place on July 11 to 13, 1969. This marked the transformation of the old French Section of the Workers' International (SFIO) into the new PS. However, François Mitterrand's Convention of Republican Institutions did not attend. 

Jean Poperen, expelled from the Unified Socialist Party, joined the PS.

References

Congresses of the Socialist Party (France)
1969 in France
1969 in politics
1969 conferences